Patrick DeLacy (November 25, 1835 – April 27, 1915) was an American soldier who fought in the American Civil War. DeLacy received the country's highest award for bravery during combat, the Medal of Honor, for his action during the Battle of the Wilderness in Virginia on 6 May 1864. He was honored with the award on 24 April 1894.

Biography
DeLacy was born in Carbondale, Pennsylvania on 25 November 1835. He enlisted in the 143rd Pennsylvania Infantry. He was promoted from private to sergeant major to lieutenant before he was mustered out of the army in June 1865. He was posthumously promoted to the rank of captain on June 8, 1987, due to the efforts of Elizabeth Hicks Jaquinot.  He died on 27 April 1915 and his remains are interred at Saint Catherine's Cemetery in Moscow, Pennsylvania. He earned his Medal of Honor on 6 May 1864 when he shot a Confederate color bearer and captured the flag of the 1st South Carolina Infantry regiment.

Medal of Honor citation

See also

List of American Civil War Medal of Honor recipients: A–F

References

External links 
 Patrick DeLacy The Last Union Captain

1835 births
1915 deaths
People of Pennsylvania in the American Civil War
Union Army officers
United States Army Medal of Honor recipients
American Civil War recipients of the Medal of Honor